Shawo Township is a township of Dongming County in southwestern Shandong province, China, located  from the Yellow River as well as the border with Henan and served by China National Highway 106. , it has 29 villages under its administration.

See also 
 List of township-level divisions of Shandong

References 

Township-level divisions of Shandong
Dongming County